Kasper Green Larsen is a Danish theoretical computer scientist. He is currently full professor at Aarhus University.

Biography
Larsen earned his doctorate from Aarhus University in 2013 under the supervision of Lars Arge.

He received several best paper awards at major conferences in theoretical computer science, including Symposium on Theory of Computing, Symposium on Foundations of Computer Science, and the International Cryptology Conference, including the Machtey Award and Danny Lewin Award for best student paper.

In 2019, Larsen received the Presburger Award from the European Association of Theoretical Computer Science for his work on lower bounds.

References

Danish computer scientists
Academic staff of Aarhus University
Living people
1986 births